Sarah Chadwick (born 11 August 1960) is an Australian television actress best known for her role on The Flying Doctors as Dr. Rowie Lang, and for her role as Marion in the 1994 film The Adventures of Priscilla, Queen of the Desert. Before she took up acting at the age of 25, Chadwick worked as a receptionist at the offices of the Nine Network. Chadwick also held a recurring role on television series, Flat Chat. She also appeared as a guest on popular Australian dramas such as Blue Heelers, G.P., All Saints and Water Rats, as well as being a presenter on the long-running children's programme, Play School. Chadwick also appeared on Home and Away.

Filmography

FILM

TELEVISION

External links
 

Living people
Australian television actresses
1960 births
Australian children's television presenters
Australian women television presenters